Herbert Gregory may refer to:
 Herbert B. Gregory (1884–1951), Virginia judge
 Herbert E. Gregory, American geologist and geographer